Flavilitoribacter nigricans is a bacterium from the family Saprospiraceae which has been isolated from beach sand near Lagos in Nigeria.

References

Further reading

External links
Type strain of Lewinella nigricans at BacDive -  the Bacterial Diversity Metadatabase	

Bacteroidota
Bacteria described in 1970